Sterren Springen Op Zaterdag (Stars Jumping On Saturday) is a Dutch reality television series produced by Eyeworks  and broadcast on SBS 6. It is the first show to use the Celebrity Splash! format created by the same company.

Dutch reality television series
2012 Dutch television series debuts
SBS6 original programming